Kédougou Airport  is an airport serving Kédougou, a town in the Tambacounda Region of Senegal.

History 
In 2019, Macky Sall announced the Kédougou Airport would be transformed into an international airport. Regular flights by Air Senegal were also in the pipeline. This transformation is part of the country's plan announced in 2018 to modernize its main airports and turn Senegal into a major hub in Western Africa.

References

External links
 
 
  

Airports in Senegal
Tambacounda Region